The Skopje student trial began on December 5, 1927 in Skopje, then in the Kingdom of Yugoslavia. The trial was against activists of the Macedonian Youth Secret Revolutionary Organization. A total of 20 Macedonian Bulgarian students stood on the bench. They were accused of fighting for an Independent Macedonia. The government of the Kingdom then pursued a policy of Serbisation towards the Slavic population of the area, called "Southern Serbia". Before the trial the students were subjected to torture. Todor Popyodranov was summoned for questioning in person by police chief Zika Lazić. He was asked to hand over the names of other students from the organization and was released "to think." Popyordanov jumped under a train and committed suicide. On the trial Ante Pavelić then a lawyer and a member of the National Assembly, appeared. He presented to the court a telegraph sent to him by the relatives of some of the defendants asking him to defend them in court. The trial ended on December 10. The most severe sentences were for Dimitar Gyuzelov and Ivan Shopov, sentenced to 20 years, Dimitar Natsev to 15 years, and Dimitar Chkatrov to 10 years in prison. During the trial, graffiti were written on the streets of Skopje, reading "Serbs, go back to Sumadia" and "Macedonia is Bulgarian!". The "Secret cultural and educational organization of the Macedonian Bulgarian women" took an active part in the process, organizing the supply of the prisoners with basic necessities. As a result of the verdicts after the trial, Mara Buneva killed  the Serb Velimir Prelić, the chief public prosecutor in the case.

Notes

Bulgarian revolutionary organisations
1920s in Yugoslavia
Politics of Yugoslavia
Modern history of Macedonia (region)
Yugoslav Macedonia
Vardar Macedonia (1918–1941)
Bulgarian nationalism
Trials in Yugoslavia